My Wife and I was a British television comedy which aired on ITV in 1958. It was produced by Associated-Rediffusion Television. It starred Mai Zetterling, Rex Garner and Joan Benham.

All 11 episodes are believed to lost.

References

External links
My Wife and I on IMDb

1958 British television series debuts
1958 British television series endings
Lost television shows
English-language television shows
ITV sitcoms
1950s British sitcoms
Black-and-white British television shows